The Russian female name Vasilisa is of Greek origin (basilissa), which means "queen" or "empress". It is the feminine form of Vasily, the Russian form of the name Basil.

Its use was inspired by a third-century Christian child martyr, Vasilissa, and several other early saints who are venerated by the Roman Catholic and Eastern Orthodox churches. It was the name of several early princesses.

People with the name
Vasilisa Bardina (b. 1987), Russian tennis player
Vasilisa Berzhanskaya, Russian operatic mezzo-soprano
Vasilisa Davankova, Russian ice dancer 
Vasilisa Davydova, Russian tennis player
Vasilisa Forbes, Russian film director 
Vasilisa Kaganovskaya, Russian ice dancer 
Vasilisa Kozhina, Russian guerilla fighter 
Vasilisa Marzaliuk, Belarusian wrestler
Vasilisa Melentyeva
Vasilisa Semenchuk, Russian freestyle skier 
Vasilisa Volodina, Russian television host
Vasilisa Volokhova, Russian noblewoman

Fictional characters
Today the name is also associated with a fairy-tale princess because of its frequent use in Russian fairy tales. The princess Vasilisa the Beautiful or Vasilisa the Wise is a stock character in Russian fairy tales, including  "The Frog Tsarevna" and "Vasilisa the Beautiful". The character often rises in status from a peasant girl to the wife of a prince; or she is a princess who marries the hero after helping him to accomplish difficult tasks. Unlike other fairy-tale heroines who wait to be rescued, Vasilisa often accomplishes a series of tasks that help her defeat the villain of the story. In the tales, the character is also usually a successful  housekeeper, which helps her win the love of the prince. 

Fictional characters with this name include:

 Vasilisa Dragomir, a character in the book series Vampire Academy by Richelle Mead
 Vasilisa Petrovna, the protagonist of the Winternight trilogy by Katherine Arden

Similar names
Basilissa (name)

Notes

References
Satran, Paula Redmond, and Rosenkrantz, Linda (2007). Baby Name Bible. St. Martin's Griffin. 
Tatar, Maria (2002). The Annotated Classic Fairy Tales. W.W. Norton and Company. 

Russian feminine given names